Jurnal de Chişinău is a Moldovan newspaper founded in 1999.

Overview 

Its head is Val Butnaru, the Jurnal Trust Media president. The Trust comprises also Jurnal TV, newspapers ECOnomist, Apropo Magazin and radio station Jurnal FM. Its headquarters are in Chişinău. Nicolae Negru and Petru Bogatu are the most known editorialists of Jurnal de Chişinău.

Notable people 
 Petru Bogatu
 Nicolae Negru
 Mariana Raţă
 Val Butnaru
 Elena Robu-Popa
 Rodica Mahu

External links 
 
 Jurnal.md
 Jurnal de Chişinău

References

Jurnal Trust Media
Newspapers published in Moldova
Mass media in Chișinău